Traralgon railway station is located on the Gippsland line in Victoria, Australia. It serves the city of Traralgon, and it opened on 1 June 1877.

The station serves as the terminus for V/Line's Traralgon line services. It was formerly the junction of the cross country branch line to Maffra and Stratford (closed between 1987-1995), and has historically been the Gippsland region's principal operational location.

Electrification of the Gippsland line to Traralgon was completed between 1954-1956, to support freight traffic in the Latrobe Valley. Freight traffic declined as demand decreased, and Traralgon station was eventually de-electrified on 2 July 1987.

In 1990, the signal box and auxiliary frame at the station were abolished, as well as the Up end connections to the former locomotive depot sidings, and the former dock platform to Maffra.

On 16 June 1995, the current station building and platform opened, as part of a commercial development on the site. This station is located on the opposite side of the railway line to the former station. The former station building still exists, and is under private ownership. The area still retains a turntable and engine shed, with the latter listed on the Victorian Heritage Register. Traralgon is now only used for passenger services, with freight operations ceasing in 1994.

In early 2019, Rail Projects Victoria announced a second platform will be built at the station. The project will also involve upgrading the existing pedestrian overpass.

Platforms and services

Traralgon has one platform. It is serviced by V/Line Traralgon line services, which terminate at the station, and Bairnsdale line services.

Platform 1:
 services to Bairnsdale and Southern Cross

Transport links

Latrobe Valley Bus Lines operates four routes via Traralgon station, under contract to Public Transport Victoria:
: Moe – Traralgon
: Traralgon – Churchill
: Traralgon – Traralgon South
: Traralgon – Churchill

South Coast Bus operates one route to and from Traralgon station, under contract to Public Transport Victoria:
to Wonthaggi

Turnbulls operates one route via Traralgon station, under contract to Public Transport Victoria:
Yarram – Traralgon

Warragul Bus Lines operates two routes via Traralgon station, under contract to Public Transport Victoria:
Garfield station – Traralgon Plaza
to Drouin North

References

External links

Victorian Railway Stations Gallery
Melway map at street-directory.com.au

Railway stations in Australia opened in 1877
Regional railway stations in Victoria (Australia)
Traralgon
Transport in Gippsland (region)
City of Latrobe